Vassdalen is a valley and rural village area in Narvik Municipality in Nordland county, Norway. The river Vassdalselva flows through Vassdalen into the lake of Hartvikvatnet. The river from Hartvikvatnet is called Elvegårdselva, flowing westwards and emptying into the Herjangsfjorden at the village of Bjerkvik.

1986 avalanche
An avalanche in Vassdalen on 5 March 1986 struck 31 soldiers from the North Norway Brigade who took part in the NATO winter exercise Anchor Express. Sixteen soldiers were killed in the accident. The avalanche came from the mountain of Storebalak (766 m.a.s.l.) and hit the valley about five kilometers upwards from Hartvikvatnet.

References

Valleys of Nordland
Narvik